Euphyia implicata is a species of geometrid moth in the family Geometridae. It is found in North America.

The MONA or Hodges number for Euphyia implicata is 7400.

References

Further reading

 
 

Euphyia
Articles created by Qbugbot
Moths described in 1858